Recording House of Ukrainian Radio is a sound recording and concert complex of Ukrainian Radio, which is a part of the 

National Public Broadcasting Company of Ukraine (UA:PBC), located in Kyiv. The Large Concert Studio of the Recording House allows to record big orchestras and choirs, it is one of the largest sound recording studio in Europe.

The Recording House serves as the rehearsal base and the main concert venue for radio ensembles of Ukrainian Radio:

 Ukrainian Radio Symphony Orchestra,
 Ukrainian Radio Choir Chapel,
 Ukrainian Radio Orchestra of folk and popular music,
 Big Children Choir of Ukrainian Radio,
 Ukrainian Radio Trio of Bandurists.

History of construction and specifications 
The design of the studio was developed in 1962, construction lasted from 1967 to 1972. It is one of the five largest recording studios in Eastern Europe built on the same project. Similar recording studios have been built in Bratislava, Moscow, Budapest, and Tashkent.

Built specifically to record large orchestral and choral ensembles, the record house has unique acoustic parameters and remains today the largest professional specialized sound recording and concert complex of Ukraine with the largest symphonic stage space. The volume of the Large Concert Studio is 9800 m3. In addition to the Large Concert Studio, the Recording House has several other studios of different size and functions, which are equipped with advanced digital equipment.

Cultural significance 
For several decades, the leading vocalists of Ukrainian music culture have been recorded in studios of the Recording House of Ukrainian Radio. In particular, the first records of Sofia Rotaru, Nazariy Yaremchuk, Volodymyr Ivasyuk, Vasil Zinkevych were created here. Voices of Yevgeniy Miroshnichenko, Anatoly Solovyanenko, Anatoly Kocherga, Ivan Patorzhinskiy, Zoya Gaidai, Borys Hmyria, Ivan Kozlovsky, Bela Rudenko, Yuriy Gulyaev, Dmytro Hnatyuk, Galina Tuftina, Maria Stefyuk, Lyudmila Yurchenko, were broadcast on Ukrainian Radio channels, thus fulfilling the function of sharing the nation's cultural heritage to future generations of Ukrainians.

Along with prominent vocalist soloists, are also recorded masterpieces performed by prominent conductors and instrumentalist soloists of different eras: Igor Oistrakh, Sviatoslav Richter, Konstantin Simeonov, Natan Rakhlin, Stepan Turchak, Mykola Petrov, Volodymyr Krainev, Mykola Suk, Oleh Krysa, Liana Isakadze, Ada Rogovtseva, Bohdan Stupka, and many others. Prominent actors such as Ada Rogovtseva, Bohdan Stupka, Natalia and Olha Sumski, Bohdan Beniuk, Anatoliy Khostikoyev, Anatoliy Palamarenko and many others created a national anthology of Ukrainian radio theater.

Ukrainian Radio audio archive, created due to work of the Recording House, has over 110,000 records.

See also 

 Recording studio
 Audio engineering
 Ukrainian Radio Symphony Orchestra
 Ukrainian Radio
 National Public Broadcasting Company of Ukraine

References 

Concert halls in Ukraine
Sound recording
Studios in Ukraine